Thomas Walsingham (died c. 1422) was a chronicler of the Peasants' Revolt.

Thomas Walsingham may also refer to:
Thomas Walsingham (died 1457), MP for Wareham and Lyme Regis
Thomas Walsingham (c. 1526 – 1584), MP for Maidstone in 1571
Thomas Walsingham (literary patron) (1561–1630), 16th-century courtier, MP for Rochester and literary patron
Thomas Walsingham (died 1669) (c.1589–1669), MP for Rochester, son of above

See also
Thomas de Grey, 2nd Baron Walsingham (1748–1818), British peer and politician; Joint Postmaster General
Thomas de Grey, 6th Baron Walsingham (1843–1919), English politician and amateur entomologist